Karaliaus Mindaugo taurė (English: King Mindaugas Cup) is an annual national domestic basketball cup competition between Lithuanian professional teams. It is organised by the Lithuanian Basketball League (Lietuvos krepšinio lyga – LKL). The tournament is named in honor of Mindaugas, the first and only King of Lithuania.

The Final four event includes an annual LKL Three-point Shootout contest, LKL Future Cup was introduced in 2018 with Žalgiris and Rytas youth teams competing for the cup. LKL Slam Dunk Contest was part of the Final four program until the event was removed in 2019.

History and format
The new tournament was presented to public on 1 December 2015, to replace the LKF Cup and the LKL All-Star Day.

In 2016 the official name was Kidy Tour King Mindaugas Cup for sponsorship purposes, where Top 8 teams after 2 rounds in the Lithuanian basketball league competed in a 3-day tournament, in Vilnius, Siemens Arena. The format was where top team after 2 LKL rounds faced 8th team in the quarterfinals, second placed team faced 7th team and so on. Lietuvos Rytas 67-57 beat Žalgiris in the final.

In 2017 Kidy Tour King Mindaugas Cup there was a slight change in the format, seeds where divided between 1-4 and 5-8 and a quarterfinal draw was introduced. Also, instead of a 3-day tournament, a Final four format was introduced where semi-finals and finals where played over the weekend. The first final four was held in Kaunas, where Žalgiris beat Lietkabelis 84–63 in the final.

The official name of King Mindaugas Cup in 2018 changed to SIL King Mindaugas Cup due to sponsorship reasons. Pairing format was kept the same, seeds were divided into 1-4 and 5-8 seeds, and the quarterfinal matches were played at the higher seed's home court. Final four was held in Klaipėda, where Žalgiris 81-62 beat Lietuvos Rytas.

In the summer of 2018 it was announced about the expansion of the tournament. Teams from lower division league NKL were introduced and the tournament started in October 2018. The official name of King Mindaugas Cup changed back to Kidy Tour King Mindaugas Cup. The 2018-2019 tournament included 10 LKL clubs and 4 clubs from the NKL league. They competed in a four-round tournament. Top 6 LKL teams received automatic placements into the quarterfinals round and the bottom 4 teams had to compete against the 4 NKL clubs. For the first-time home and away matches were played in the quarterfinals round. The final four was held in Vilnius for the second time, where Rytas 70-67 beat Žalgiris in the final.

In the summer of 2019 it was decided to change the format again, introducing two more clubs from the NKL, expanding the total number of teams to 16. 4 round system is kept the same, where bottom 6 LKL teams will be seeded versus the unseeded NKL clubs. Out of the 6 winners in the first round 2 teams that had the best record in their league last year will receive an automatic placement into the quarterfinals round, the other 4 teams will be paired and will play home and away games for the 2 remaining spots in the quarterfinals round. In the quarterfinals round teams that placed 1 to 4 last year will be seeded against teams that made their way through the second round. Final four will be held on the 15-16 of February, location is yet to be decided.

In 2021 the official name was Citadele King Mindaugas Cup for sponsorship purposes. The 2021 tournament included 10 LKL clubs and 6 clubs from the NKL league. They competed in a two-round tournament. Top 4 LKL teams received automatic placements into the quarterfinals round and the 6 bottom LKL teams had to compete against 6 NKL clubs. The final four took place on the 13-14 of February and was held in Panevėžys for the first time. In the final Žalgiris 78–69 beat Lietkabelis and defended its title.

Winners

Performance by club 
Teams shown in italics are no longer in existence.

Performers

See also
LKL
LKL MVP
LKL Finals
LKL Finals MVP
King Mindaugas Cup MVP
LKF Cup
List of Lithuanian basketball league champions
Basketball in Lithuania

References

External links 
 Official LKL website
 Official LKL YouTube.com channel
 Lithuanian league at Eurobasket.com

 
Basketball cup competitions in Lithuania
Recurring sporting events established in 2016
2016 establishments in Lithuania
Lith